Plesiocystiscus pseudogranulina is a species of very small sea snail, a marine gastropod mollusk or micromollusk in the family Cystiscidae. It is primarily found near Russia.

Description
Has a shell size of 1.2 millimeters.

Distribution
Can be found in South Africa.

References

Cystiscidae
Gastropods described in 1998